Muharraq Island, formerly known as Moharek, is the second largest island in the archipelago of Bahrain after Bahrain Island.

History
It is named after Muharraq City, the former capital of Bahrain.
The Al Khalifa dynasty settled there in the nineteenth century and resided there until 1923. The island dominated trade, fishing and especially pearls industries in Bahrain. The Pearl center was made a UNESCO world heritage site in 2012.
In recent years, north of Muharraq Island have a major reclamation of some artificial islands like Amwaj Islands. The south of the island, at Hidd district, the new Bahrain International Investment Park of the free zone (BIIP) was built.
And in the far south, new Khalifa bin Salman harbor, which opened in 2009.

Demography

There are several towns and villages located on the Island, including:
 Al Muharraq
 Al Dair
 Arad, formerly a separate island of its own
 Busaiteen
 Hidd
 Galali
 Halat Bu Maher
 Samaheej

Administration
The island belongs to Muharraq Governorate.

Transportation

The island has the  Bahrain International Airport  that follows the long east–west axis. 
The island has the  Muharraq Airfield (ICAO code:none) adjacent to Bahrain International Airport. 
There are three causeways connecting Muharraq Island with Manama on Bahrain Island:
 Shaikh Hamad Bridge: From Muharraq City to Diplomatic Area
 Shaikh Isa bin Salman Causeway: From Muharraq City/Busaiteen to Diplomatic Area
 Shaikh Khalifa Bridge: From Hidd to Juffair

Image gallery

Citations

Bibliography

 .
 .

Islands of Bahrain
Islands of the Persian Gulf